Srđan Bižić (born 24 October 1990) is a Serbian football forward, playing for Proleter Pečenog.

Club career
Born in Kraljevo, Bižić started his career with local club Sloga, where he appeared until the end of his youth categories and also performed for the first team as a bonus player between 2007 and 2009. In summer 2009, he was loaned to Metalac Trgovački, where he spent the first half of the 2009–10 Serbian League West season. Later he moved to Mladost Oplanići where he stayed for two years. Next he was a member of TJ Rozvoj Pušovce in 2012. He returned to Metalac at the beginning of next year and later he also played with Karađorđe Ribnica and Partizan Bumbarevo Brdo. In 2014, Bižić realised his second spell with his home club Sloga Kraljevo, making 5 Serbian First League and 1 cup appearance for the first half of the 2014–15 season. After he spent a half-season with Braća Vuković, Bižić joined Rozvoj Pušovce for the second time in summer 2015. At the beginning 2016, Bižić moved to Germany and joined SV FC Sandzak Frankfurt. In summer 2016, he moved back to Braća Vuković, where he spent the first half-season in the Morava Zone League. In the winter break off-season, Bižić joined OFK Radnički Kovači. He moved to Proleter Pečenog next summer.

References

External links
 
 Srđan Bižić profile & stats at ligy.sk

1990 births
Living people
Sportspeople from Kraljevo
Association football forwards
Serbian footballers
FK Sloga Kraljevo players
TJ Rozvoj Pušovce players
3. Liga (Slovakia) players
Serbian expatriate footballers
Serbian expatriate sportspeople in Slovakia
Expatriate footballers in Slovakia
Serbian expatriate sportspeople in Germany
Expatriate footballers in Germany
Serbian First League players
OFK Radnički Kovači players